Terrington St John is a village and civil parish in the English county of Norfolk. The village lies to the south of the route of the A47 between Peterborough and Kings Lynn.

For the purposes of local government, it falls within the district of King's Lynn and West Norfolk.

The Church of St John is a Grade I listed building.

History
The villages name means 'Farm/settlement of Tir(a)'s people' or perhaps, 'farm/settlement connected with Tir(a)'. 'St. John' from the church dedication.

According to Gardiner, "The church of St. John dates from 1423[... and] a curious stone in the church-yard has been pointed out as 'Hickathrift's Candles'".

See also
Terrington St Clement
Terrington railway station

Notes 

http://kepn.nottingham.ac.uk/map/place/Norfolk/Terrington%20St.%20John

External links

Villages in Norfolk
King's Lynn and West Norfolk
Civil parishes in Norfolk